Walkden is a surname. Notable people with the surname include:

Alexander Walkden, 1st Baron Walkden (1873–1951), British trade union leader and Labour politician
Bianca Walkden (born 1991), British taekwondo practitioner
Christine Walkden (born 1955), British television presenter and gardener
Christopher Walkden (1938-2011), British Olympic swimmer
Evelyn Walkden (1893-1970), British politician and trade unionist
George Walkden (1883-1923), English cricketer who played first class cricket for Derbyshire
Pat Walkden (born 1946), South African female tennis player
Peter Walkden (1684–1769), English Presbyterian minister and diarist